A disgorger is used in coarse fishing to remove a fish hook from deep inside the mouth of a fish that is not possible to reach using fingers alone. It is also known as the Unhooker or Hook remover. It is typically made of plastic or metal and is used on smaller fish. Larger fish that are hooked deep inside the mouth can be unhooked using a pair of forceps or a pair of long-nose pliers.

Usage 
A disgorger is used by slipping the end over a tight line and sliding down to the bend of the hook. A push is then needed to remove the hook. Under the pressure of the line, the hook will tighten against the end of the disgorger and can be removed from the mouth.

References

Fishing equipment